Toke Makinwa (born 3 November 1984) is a Nigerian radio personality, television host, vlogger, lifestyle entrepreneur, actress and author. Toke is known for hosting The Morning Drive on Rhythm 93.7 FM and for her YouTube vlog series Toke Moments. She released her book On Becoming in November 2016. She is one of the top five African female show hosts.

Early life and education
Toke Makinwa was born on 3 November 1984, in Lagos state. She attended the Federal Government Girls' College in Oyo State. Makinwa later attended the University of Lagos, where she earned a BA degree in English and Literature

Career

In 2010, Makinwa made her major media debut on Rhythm 93.7 FM's The Morning Drive show as a co-host. In 2012, she made a television appearance as host of the Most Beautiful Girl in Nigeria (MBGN) beauty pageant, which was broadcast live across Nigeria. She co-hosted Flytime TV's  3 Live Chicks, along with Tosyn Bucknor and Oreka Godis. The show debuted as a web series before expanding to terrestrial television in late 2012. Makinwa did not renew her contract with Flytime TV for the show's second season and was subsequently replaced by her radio colleague Omalicha. In 2012, Makinwa launched her YouTube vlog series Toke Moments. In 2013 she won the Nigeria Broadcasters Award for Outstanding Female Presenter of the Year. She was nominated for 'Radio OAP of the Year' in the Nigeria Entertainment Awards. The same year, she became an ambassador of the United Africa Company of Nigeria.

In January 2014, Hip Hop World Magazine announced Makinwa as the host of its interview and talk series Trending. She also secured a spot on EbonyLife TV as a co-host of its flagship show Moments.

Makinwa has hosted numerous notable events, including the 2013 Future and City People Awards, as well as the 2014 Headies Awards. In March 2021 it was officially announced that Toke Makinwa was paired with Nollywood actress, Nancy Isime to host the third season of The Voice Nigeria.
On October 16, 2021, Toke Makinwa was unveiled as the host of Gulder Ultimate Search Season 12. In November 2021, her new TV show "Talk With Toke Makinwa" premiered on MultiChoice. In 2022, Toke played the character Louise in Bunmi Adesoye and Abimbola Craig’s Glamour Girls

On Becoming and handbag line
Makinwa lost both of her parents to a fire accident when she was eight years old. She released her memoir On Becoming in November 2016. The book talks about her personal struggles and addresses the betrayal of her now ex-husband, Maje Ayida. Makinwa went on a book tour to promote the book. The tour included Nigeria, South Africa, the U.S, the U.K, and parts of East Africa.

In 2017, Makinwa launched a handbag line under her eponymous label, Toke Makinwa Luxury. She also launched a skincare product called Glow by TM in 2018.

Endorsements
In 2013, Makinwa became an ambassador of the United Africa Company of Nigeria, alongside Osas Ighodaro, Dare Art Alade and Dan Foster. She also signed a multi-million naira contract with Nestlé Nigeria to become the new face of Maggi. In 2016, she became the brand ambassador and face of Mecran Cosmetics. She has also been an ambassador for Payporte and Ciroc. In November 2019, Toke signed an endorsement deal as brand ambassador with Oppo mobile Telecommunications In 2021, Toke signed an endorsement with Showmax naija as the host for BBN season 6 the buzz.

Personal life
She lost both her parents in a gas explosion when she was 8 years old. 
On 15 January 2014 Makinwa married Maje Ayida whom she had been involved  with for eight years prior to their wedding. In 2015, she separated from Ayida after discovering that he had impregnated his ex-girlfriend. On 5 October 2017, Makinwa's marriage to Ayida was dissolved by a Lagos High Court on the grounds that Ayida committed adultery. At the end of Big Brother Naija season 6, which she served as a host, she disclosed that she had lost her elder sister. In March 2022,she suggested that anyone doubting her claim to fame should research about her achievements using Google.

Filmography 
 Makate Must Sell
 Glamour Girls
 Blood Sisters
 Love Is War
 Sugar Rush
 Therapy (comedy web series)

Awards

References

Nigerian radio personalities
University of Lagos alumni
Living people
Nigerian television talk show hosts
Yoruba radio personalities
Yoruba women television personalities
People from Lagos
1984 births
Silverbird Communications people
Nigerian YouTubers
Television personalities from Lagos
Yoruba women in business
Beauty pageant hosts
Nigerian cosmetics businesspeople
Nigerian memoirists
Yoruba women writers
Nigerian fashion businesspeople
Nigerian women in business
Nigerian TikTokers
Nigerian television personalities
Nigerian television presenters
Nigerian radio presenters
Nigerian women radio presenters
Nigerian media personalities
Nigerian businesspeople
Nigerian television actresses
Nigerian film actresses
Nigerian bloggers
Residents of Lagos